The 19th Central Committee (19th CC) of the Chinese Communist Party was elected by the 19th National Congress in 2017, and sat until the next National Congress was convened in 2022. It formally succeeded the 18th Central Committee of the Chinese Communist Party and preceded the 20th Central Committee of the Chinese Communist Party.

The committee is composed of full members and alternate members. A member has voting rights, while an alternate does not. If a full member is removed from the Central Committee the vacancy is then filled by an alternate member at the next committee plenum – the alternate member who received the most confirmation votes in favour is highest on the order of precedence. To be elected to the Central Committee, a candidate must be a party member for at least five years.

The first plenary session in 2017 was responsible for electing the bodies in which the authority of the Central Committee is invested when it is not in session: the Politburo and the Politburo Standing Committee. It was also responsible for approving the members of the Secretariat, 19th Central Commission for Discipline Inspection and its Standing Committee. The third plenary session in 2018 nominated candidates for state positions. The fourth plenary session issued a decision on modernizing governance.

Plenums

Apparatus

Heads of department-level institutions

Heads of  institutions

Membership

Members
 Notes
 The Hanzi column is listed according to the number of strokes in their surnames, which is the official ordering method.

Alternates

References

Citations

Sources 

 Databases
The three links below are databases on individual Central Committee members. You can find their individual work history, birthdate, or ethnicity. Search for individuals or press on their names and you'll be led to a page devoted to the specific individual you searched for.
  
  
  

 General
Plenary sessions, apparatus heads, ethnicity, the Central Committee member- and alternate membership, Politburo membership, Secretariat membership, Central Military Commission members, Standing Committee of the Central Commission for Discipline Inspection membership, Central Commission for Discipline Inspection, offices an individual held, retirement, if the individual in question is military personnel, female, has been expelled, is currently under investigation or has retired:
 
 
 
 
 
 
 

Central Committee of the Chinese Communist Party
2017 establishments in China